Ingrid Bruckert (born 19 November 1952), also known as Ingrid Bruckert-Redmer, is a retired German field hockey player.

Bruckert played for Eintracht Braunschweig. With her club, she won seven German championship titles. She also played 110 games in total for the German national team.

With West Germany, Bruckert won the 1976 and 1981 Women's Hockey World Cups. She was also called up to the West German squad for the 1980 Summer Olympics. However, due to the 1980 Summer Olympics boycott, the West German team ultimately did not enter the tournament.

In 1977, Bruckert was awarded the Silbernes Lorbeerblatt. In 1988, she was inducted into the hall of fame of the Lower Saxon Institute of Sports History.

References

External links 
 

1952 births
Living people
German female field hockey players
Sportspeople from Braunschweig
Recipients of the Silver Laurel Leaf